London Southend Airport  is a minor international airport situated on the outskirts of Southend-on-Sea in Essex, England, approximately  from the centre of London. The airport straddles the boundaries between the city of Southend-on-Sea and the Rochford District.

Southend was London's third-busiest airport from the 1960s until the end of the 1970s, when it was overtaken in passenger numbers by London Stansted Airport. Following its purchase by Stobart Group in 2008, a development programme provided a new terminal and control tower, extended the runway, and added a connection to central London via a regular rail service running between Liverpool Street Station and Southend Airport Station on the Shenfield–Southend line, continuing on to Southend Victoria.

Overview

Description

The current terminal was completed in February 2012. The terminal has since been extended by 90 metres, almost tripling the facility in size.  The former terminal now provides facilities for the handling of executive aircraft, with a business lounge and conference rooms. A four-star Holiday Inn hotel adjacent to the airport entrance, owned by the Stobart Group, opened on 1 October 2012, at that time having the only rooftop restaurant in Essex.

London Southend was voted the best airport in Britain for three consecutive years by consumer group Which?, in 2013, 2014 and again in 2015, and best London airport for 6 consecutive years 2013-2019.

Operations

Southend Airport handles mainly scheduled passenger, charter, cargo and business flights, with some pilot training (both fixed-wing aircraft and helicopter) and private aircraft flying. The airport is run by London Southend Airport Co Ltd, which employs more than 150 people directly. Due to expansion, there were over 500 more people working at the airport in summer 2012 compared with summer 2011.

Southend Airport has a Civil Aviation Authority (CAA) Ordinary Licence that allows flights for the public transport of passengers or for flying instruction as authorised by the licensee (London Southend Airport Company Limited).

Southend Airport has an excellent weather record, and is used by airlines as a diversion alternative when adverse weather or incidents cause other London airports to be closed.

Airline ground handling is provided by the Stobart Group-owned Stobart Aviation Services, while the Stobart Jet Centre handles executive aircraft using the facility.

Companies located within the airport boundary employ more than 800 workers. Previously British World Airlines had its head office at Viscount House at London Southend Airport.

EasyJet began operating services by opening a base at Southend in April 2012 and Irish carrier Aer Lingus Regional began regular flights to Dublin in May, resulting in a rapid increase in airport passenger numbers during 2012, with 721,661 using the airport in that year, 969,912 in 2013 and 1,102,358 in 2014. The following year saw a decline to 900,648 and again to 874,549 in 2016, while 2017 saw passenger numbers increase more than 25% to 1,095,914. In 2011, the airport operator planned to reach passenger numbers of two million per year by 2020. In 2018, Southend Airport saw an increase of nearly 400,000 passengers over the previous year's total, with just over 1.4 million passengers using the airport, the highest annual total at the airport to that date.

History

Early years

The airfield was established by the Royal Flying Corps during World War I. It was the largest flying ground in Essex, with the greatest number of units. In May 1915 the Royal Navy Air Service (RNAS) took over until 4 June 1916, when it became RFC Rochford. It was designated as night fighter station and many sorties were flown against Zeppelin airship raiders, including LZ38 on 31 May 1915. Around 1919, the station closed and reverted to farmland, which it remained as until the 1930s.

The airport was officially opened as a municipal airport on 18 September 1935 by the Under-Secretary of State for Air, Sir Philip Sassoon, who arrived in his de Havilland Leopard Moth.

In 1939, the Air Ministry requisitioned the airfield and it was known as RAF Rochford during World War II as a satellite airfield. During World War II, it became a base for fighter squadrons comprising Supermarine Spitfires and Hawker Hurricanes as well as Bristol Blenheims. Many of the 50 pillboxes that were designed to protect the airport from paratroop landings still survive, as does the underground defence control room, which is near to Southend Flying Club. A further 20 or so pillboxes also remain in the surrounding countryside.

1993: Regional Airports Ltd

In 1993, after the airport had been losing money for many years, Southend Borough Council sold the airport to Regional Airports Ltd (RAL), operator of Biggin Hill Airport. London Southend Airport Co Ltd was formed to operate the airport which was re-branded as "London Southend Airport" with the term "Municipal" dropping from the title. The previous losses were turned into small profits for majority of tenure by RAL. 

The largest aircraft ever to land at the Airport was in November 1998 when a Lockheed L-1011 Tristar of Irish airline Aer Turas arrived for scrapping at the airport.

In 2001, a debate centred on the possible relocation of the Grade I listed St Laurence and All Saints Church further away from the side of the main runway. The proposal was dropped after the planning application was rejected by Southend Council in 2003, and a compromise scheme was implemented resulting in the installation of new barriers across Eastwoodbury Lane and requiring slightly shorter licensed runway lengths once safety areas had been added. These changes allowed passenger flights to be restarted, although the runway length still largely curtailed the potential range and payloads for passenger flights, and scheduled airline utilisation was low, until the March 2012 runway extension opened.

Flightline was an airline formed in 1989 headquartered at Southend, where they also had a maintenance/engineering base for their own and third party aircraft. They mainly operated British Aerospace 146 aircraft on ad-hoc charters, and an Avro RJ100 regional jet with which they operated a regular service between Southend and Cologne from 7 June 2006 to 1 December 2008 on behalf of Ford Motor Company as a corporate shuttle. Flightline went into administration on 3 December 2008.

In January 2008, Regional Airports Ltd put the airport up for sale.

Flybe operated a once weekly summer-only service to Jersey using Dash 8 aircraft, ending in 2011.

2008: Stobart Group

The airport was bought on 2 December 2008 by the Stobart Group for £21 million, becoming part of the Stobart Air division of the Stobart Group, which also operates Carlisle Airport.
 
Planning permission was granted 20 January 2010.
Initially subject to an Article 14 Direction, after due consideration by the Government this was withdrawn 19 March 2010, meaning it would not be subject to a Public Inquiry. A Section 106 agreement was entered into between the airport and local councils.

On 1 June 2010, Stobart Group took a £100 million loan from M & G Investments, partly in order to fund the airport construction. In July 2010, an application for a judicial review of the planning application was filed, which was dismissed on 2 February 2011. On 23 September 2010, the airport received the Airport Achievement Award 2010/11 from the European Regions Airline Association.

A replacement air traffic control tower became operational 21 March 2011, followed by the return of year-round daily passenger services 27 March 2011 when Aer Arann commenced services to Galway and Waterford in Ireland.

EasyJet announced a ten-year agreement with Stobart Group in June 2011, and in April 2012 commenced around 70 flights per week from Southend, using three Airbus A319 aircraft based at the airport, flying to eight European destinations. Easyjet's operation at the airport has since increased to 16 destinations and in the summer of 2018 they will base a fourth aircraft at Southend, an Airbus A320.

A new on-site rail station opened on 18 July 2011 (the official opening by Minister for Transport Theresa Villiers MP was on 21 September 2011), and a new road opened on 1 September 2011, replacing Eastwoodbury Lane that lay in the path required for the runway extension.

2012–2019: London Olympics and expansion of passenger flights
Before the 2012 Summer Olympic Games, a new terminal was built by Buckingham Group Contracting Ltd during 2011 and opened 28 February 2012 (the official opening was by Justine Greening, Secretary of State for Transport, on 5 March 2012). The original terminal has been redeveloped for use by private jets, with Stobart Air having invested half a million pounds turning it into an executive business lounge.

The extended runway opened on 8 March 2012, with Category I ILS on both ends of the runway.

In spring 2014, Stobart Air announced that it had agreed a five-year franchise agreement with Flybe which would see two Flybe-branded aircraft based at Southend operating six routes from summer 2014. On 18 January 2015, two routes were terminated with the operation reduced to one aircraft. On 7 April 2014, the extension to the passenger terminal was formally opened by Patrick McLoughlin, the Secretary of State for Transport.

ATC Lasham, the major engineering company at the airport, entered administration in October 2015. The main hangar that it used dated back to Aviation Traders Engineering Limited (ATEL) – founded by the late Sir Freddie Laker – and was later used by Heavylift Engineering.

In December 2016, Flybe announced it would be adding new routes from summer 2017 to 12 European destinations, primarily aimed at the weekend break customers. The airline based two Embraer 195 aircraft at the airport.
In October 2017, Flybe added high frequency domestic routes to the airport, with up to 18 flights per week to Manchester, up to 16 flights per week to Dublin and up to 10 flights per week to Glasgow. An additional ATR 72 was based at the airport to operate the Manchester flights, bringing the total number of Flybe aircraft based at Southend to four.

In February 2018, Air Malta announced it would begin flights to Cagliari, Catania and Malta, which began in May 2018 although the Cagliari and Catania flights ceased in January 2019.
In June 2018, Ryanair announced it would open a base at Southend, basing three aircraft there operating 55 flights per week to 13 destinations, which began in April 2019.
In October 2018, Flybe announced it would commence five flights per week to Newquay Airport from April 2019, increasing to daily from May 2019.

In May 2019, Loganair started to fly to Aberdeen, Glasgow and Stornoway; in July 2019 to Carlisle, and Derry flights moved from Stansted to Southend on 27 October 2019.
On 31 October 2019 Ryanair announced four new routes to launch in Summer 2020 - Bergerac, Girona and Marseille were first announced before Rodez was announced as the route was moved from Stansted to Southend.
On 14 November 2019 Loganair announced that the Stornoway to Glasgow to Southend service would be withdrawn from 3 January 2020.

COVID-19 pandemic and consolidation since 2020
On 22 January 2020, Norwegian airline Widerøe announced it would move its Kristiansand route from Stansted to Southend at the start of the Summer 2020 season, however due to the COVID-19 pandemic this had been postponed until 26 October 2020. On 20 February 2020, it was announced Loganair would suspend its Aberdeen service and on 23 March, similarly the Carlisle service.

At the commencement of the COVID-19 UK lockdown, Wizz Air's revised schedule consolidated the Sibiu route at Luton Airport from when it re-started, cutting the route from Southend. In June 2020, Wizz Air cut Vilnius as a destination from Southend as well, leaving it with one route to Bucharest which had been suspended as well since.

On 17 August 2020, easyJet announced it would close its base at Southend entirely due to the Coronavirus pandemic, the last scheduled flight occurring on 31 August 2020. On 6 August 2021, Ryanair also announced the closure of its base at Southend, effective 30 October 2021 leaving the airport with barely any scheduled services for the time being. On 17 December 2021, easyJet announced that they would return to the airport in a limited capacity with routes to Málaga and Palma de Mallorca.

In September 2022, Amazon Air announced it would terminate its cargo flights from Southend to Rome which was the airport's sole scheduled freight operation.

Airlines and destinations
The following airline operates regular scheduled flights to and from London-Southend:

Statistics

Ground transport

Rail
Since 2011, the airport has its own railway station near the terminal building, Southend Airport railway station on the Shenfield to Southend Line, which is served by Abellio Greater Anglia connecting the airport to Liverpool Street station in London up to eight times per hour during peak times and Southend Victoria railway station in the other direction respectively. The journey to London takes about 55 minutes.

A later train has now been added to London every night, except Saturday night, and an earlier train to the airport from London every day, except Sunday morning.

Bus
The airport is served by buses operated by Arriva Southend from the airport entrance to Southend (7, 8 and 9), Rochford (7 and 8), Ashingdon (7), Hawkwell (8), Hockley (7 and 8), Eastwood (9) and Rayleigh (7, 8 and 9). First Essex operates Essex Airlink X30 from the terminal to Chelmsford and Stansted Airport. Since 5 October 2019, Ensignbus have operated the Jetlink X1, a night bus service running once in each direction from Southend Airport to Grosvenor Gardens, London via Lakeside Shopping Centre bus station, Canning Town and Embankment stations, however this bus service has since been withdrawn due to it being banned by the airport authorities.

Accidents and incidents
On 11 February 1944, Boeing B-17 42-31694 of the USAAF (511th BS) crash-landed and burned out at Southend, after receiving battle damage on a raid on Frankfurt.
On 11 May 1944, B17G 42-107147 of the USAAF (360BS) made an emergency wheels-up landing with heavy flak damage after a mission to Saarbrücken.
On 12 July 1957, a Lockheed Constellation of TWA made an emergency landing while routeing from Frankfurt to Heathrow, with one engine on fire.
 On 28 July 1959, an East Anglian Flying Services Vickers 614 Viking 1 (registered G-AHPH) was written off in a landing accident. On approach the aircraft's right-hand main gear indicator showed that the gear was unsafe. An emergency landing was made on the grass parallel to the runway. The right gear collapsed and the aircraft swung to the right, damaging it beyond repair. None of the 39 occupants were injured.
On 9 October 1960, a Handley Page Hermes of Falcon Airways (registration: G-ALDC) overran the runway on landing, ending up across the Shenfield to Southend railway line. The aircraft was written off but all 76 people on board survived.
On 3 May 1967, a Vickers Viscount of Channel Airways (registration: G-AVJZ) was written off when a propeller was feathered on take-off. Two people on the ground died.
On 4 May 1968, a Vickers Viscount of Channel Airways (registration: G-APPU) overran the runway having landed at too high a speed. The aircraft was written off.
On 3 June 1971, a Douglas DC-3 of Moormanair (registration: PH-MOA) returned for an emergency landing with one engine partially failed, shortly after departure to the Netherlands carrying supporters of Ajax Football Club. It overran on landing, colliding with an earth bank at the end of the runway and slightly injuring 2 of the 32 passengers on board.
On 4 October 1974, the flight engineer of a DAT Douglas DC-6 (registration: OO-VGB) retracted the nose gear during take-off, even though the aircraft was not yet airborne, due to a communication error with the pilots. The aircraft slid along the runway and was damaged beyond repair. Of the 99 passengers on board the flight to Antwerp, one was severely injured and another four received minor injuries from evacuating the aircraft. The six crew members remained uninjured.
On 9 March 1986, a Vickers Viscount (registration: G-BLNB) made a wheels up landing, the landing gear warning horn not having functioned correctly. There were no injuries to the 3 occupants; after repair the aircraft was returned to service.
On 12 September 1987, a Beechcraft 200 (registration: G-WSJE) carrying newspapers crashed at night into Mac's Garage on the Eastwood Road. The pilot, 33-year-old Hugh Forrester Brown from nearby Canewdon, was thought to have attempted to crash land on the road after take-off, but was unable to and hit the empty garage; he was killed in the crash.
On 11 January 1988, a Vickers Viscount of British Air Ferries (registration: G-APIM) was damaged beyond economic repair when it was in a ground collision with a Fairflight Short 330 (registration: G-BHWT). The BAF Viscount was subsequently repaired and donated to Brooklands Museum for preservation.
On 6 March 1997, a Piper PA-34 Seneca (registration: G-NJML) flying a charter taking aircraft spare parts to Ostend, crashed  to the north-east of the airport while attempting to return following the failure of the gyroscope in the aircraft's attitude indicator. One of the two occupants died; the other was seriously injured.
On 19 July 2006, a Cessna 150 (registration: G-BABB) being flown by a student pilot on his second solo flight crashed into a public park  from the airport. The student pilot was fatally injured.

See also
Expansion of London Southend Airport
List of airports in the United Kingdom and the British Crown Dependencies
Airports of London
Military history of Britain
Military history of the United Kingdom during World War II
Southend Airport Aviation Database

References

Bibliography
 (Airliner World online)

External links

Official website

Airports in the London region
Airports in Essex
Airports established in 1914
Transport in Rochford District
Transport in Southend-on-Sea
Buildings and structures in Southend-on-Sea